Martin Hunter (born 3 October 1965) is an Australian sprint canoeist who competed from the late 1980s to the mid-1990s. He won three medals at the ICF Canoe Sprint World Championships with a gold (K-1 500 m: 1989) and two bronzes (K-1 500 m: 1990, K-2 500 m: 1994).

Hunter also competed in two Summer Olympics, earning his best finish of seventh in the K-1 500 m event at Seoul in 1988.

He was an Australian Institute of Sport sprint canoeing scholarship holder in 1988, 1990 and 1996.

References 

1965 births
Australian male canoeists
Canoeists at the 1988 Summer Olympics
Canoeists at the 1992 Summer Olympics
Living people
Olympic canoeists of Australia
Australian Institute of Sport canoeists
ICF Canoe Sprint World Championships medalists in kayak
20th-century Australian people